"" (English: "Isn't That Enough"), is the debut single from Moana Maniapoto. Produced by Dalvanius Prime and sung in the Māori language, the song was used in a campaign for the Alcohol Advisory Council of New Zealand. In 1993, the song was re-recorded as a pop-reggae version entitled "Kua Makona (Kori Kori Tinana Mix)", released as a single by Maniapoto's group Moana & the Moa Hunters. This version was later included on their debut album Tahi (1993).

Background and composition

Maniapoto sung in clubs and cover bands, however musician Dalvanius Prime encouraged her to release her own music. The pair first met after one of Prime's concerts, when Maniapoto's ex-husband Willie Jackson approached Prime and introduced Maniapoto to him as a promising musician.

A year later, Prime contacted Maniapoto and asked her to take part in a campaign for the Alcohol Advisory Council of New Zealand, around promoting moderation among Māori. The campaign featured a pop song sung in Te Reo Māori, produced by Prime and Ryan Monga (of Ardijah), which was released as a single under Prime's label Maui Records in 1986.

The song describes a woman's love and despair she feels for a man with a drinking problem, and is a warning on the perils of driving under the influence of alcohol. The lyrics of the song were written by Ngamaru Raerino, who at the time was the Māori coordinator for Alcohol Advisory Council .

The campaign launched in 1987, featuring a music video (which included an appearance by Hinewehi Mohi), and a number of magazine appearances. During this time, Maniapoto was working as a barrister and graphic artist at Kia Mōhio Kia Mārama Trust, and singing at Club 21 on Queen Street with her band Whiteline. Maniapoto was unused to the fashion style that Prime suggested for the magazine and music video appearances, feeling as if he had transformed her into "the Māori Cher". The single began charting on the New Zealand singles chart in May 1987, peaking at number 27 in June. At the 1987 New Zealand Music Awards, "Kua Makona" was nominated for Best Polynesian work, losing to Herbs' "E Papa / Jah Knows". At the same awards ceremony, Maniapoto won the Most Promising Female Vocalist award.

After the formation of her band Moana & the Moa Hunters, the song was revisited in 1993, re-recorded as a pop reggae song and released as a double A-side single with "Peace, Love and Family" before the release of the group's debut album Tahi. The original version of the song was added to the 1996 CD release of the Pātea Māori Club album Poi E.

Track listings

NZ 7-inch single (MAUI 10)
"Kua Makona"  – 2:50
"Kua Makona" (Instrumental)  – 2:50

NZ 12-inch single and cassette single
"Kua Makona" (Dance Mix)  – 2:50
"Kua Makona" (Computer Blues Mix)  – 2:50
"Kua Makona" (Maxi Mix)  – 2:50
"Kua Makona" (Moana's Theme)  – 2:50
"Kua Makona" (Computer Blues Percussive Mix)  – 2:50
"Kua Makona" (Ballad Vocal/ Instrumental)  – 2:50

NZ 7-inch single (MAUI 12)
"Kua Makona" (Dance Mix)  – 2:50
"Kua Makona" (Moana's Theme)  – 2:50

1993 NZ CD single
"Peace, Love and Family"  – 4:10
"Peace, Love and Family (Club Mix)"  – 3:45
"Kua Makona (Kori Kori Tinana Mix)"  – 4:26
"Kua Makona (Tuarua Mix)"  – 3:02
"Peace, Love and Family (Acapella)"  – 3:22

Credits and personnel
Credits for the 1986 version adapted from the "Kua Makona" single.

Computer Blues – executive producer
Moana Maniapoto-Jackson – vocalist
Graham Myhre – engineering
Dalvanius Prime – co-producer, director, writer
Ngamaru Raerino – writer

Credits for the 1993 version adapted from the "Peace, Love and Family" / "Kua Makona" single.

Kōwhai Intermediate School – haka
Angus McNaughton – producer, engineer, programming, mixing
Moana Maniapoto – lead vocal, additional lyrics
Dalvanius Prime – writer
Ngamaru Raerino – writer
Teremoana Rapley – rap
Mina Ripia – rap

Charts

References

1986 songs
1986 debut singles
1993 singles
Alcohol in New Zealand
Māori-language songs
New Zealand songs
Song recordings produced by Dalvanius Prime
Songs about driving under the influence
Works about alcoholism